The Girl Guides Association of Antigua and Barbuda is the Guiding organization of Antigua and Barbuda. It serves 718 members (as of 2003). Founded in 1931, the girls-only organization became an associate member of the World Association of Girl Guides and Girl Scouts in 1984 and a full member in 2002. 

The Girl Guide Association of Antigua and Barbuda belongs to the Caribbean Link. At the introduction of the West Indies political federation, the Antigua association linked with other Caribbean associations. Although the West Indies Federation was undone, the Girl Guide Associations' link remains.

Program

Sections
The association is divided in five sections according to age:
Tweenie - ages 3 to 6
Brownie Guide - ages 6 to 10 
Girl Guide - ages 10 to 15
Ranger Guide - ages 15 to 18
Young Leader - ages 18 to 25
Leader/Guider - ages 25 and older

Guide Promise
I promise that I will do my best:
To do my duty to God
To serve the Queen and my country and help other people
And to keep the Guide Law.

Guide Law
A Guide is loyal and can be trusted.
A Guide is honest.
A Guide is polite and considerate.
A Guide is friendly and a sister to all Guides.
A Guide is kind to animals and respects all living things.
A Guide is obedient.
A Guide has courage and is cheerful in all difficulties.
A Guide makes good use of her time.
A Guide takes care of her own possession and those of other people.
A Guide is self-controlled in all she thinks, says, and does.

Activities
The Peggy Rodgers Fund was set up in memory of a Guiding Island Commissioner. It assists with the training and development of Guides and has sent them to overseas Guiding events.

Dame Nellie Robinson was a pioneer of Guiding in Antigua.

In 2001, the Guides were involved in a composting pilot project with the Antigua National Solid Waste Management Authority.

See also
 Antigua and Barbuda Branch of The Scout Association

External links
Girl Guides Association of Antigua and Barbuda

References

World Association of Girl Guides and Girl Scouts member organizations
Scouting and Guiding in Antigua and Barbuda
Youth organizations established in 1931